Senator Ruckelshaus may refer to:

John C. Ruckelshaus (1930–2015), Indiana State Senate
John Ruckelshaus (fl. 1990s–2010s), Indiana State Senate